Jennifer Whalen is a Canadian actress and comedian, best known as one of the creators and stars of the sketch comedy series Baroness von Sketch Show. 
 
An alumna of the Toronto company of The Second City, she was a writer for This Hour Has 22 Minutes before launching Baroness von Sketch with her castmates Meredith MacNeill, Aurora Browne and Carolyn Taylor.

At the 5th Canadian Screen Awards in 2017, the troupe were nominated for Best Ensemble Performance in a Variety or Sketch Comedy Series, and won the award for Best Writing in a Variety or Sketch Comedy Series; at the 6th Canadian Screen Awards in 2018, the troupe won the awards in both of the same categories.

She has also had acting roles in the television series InSecurity and The Beaverton, and wrote for the television series The Gavin Crawford Show, SketchCom, Instant Star, The Ron James Show, InSecurity and The Dating Guy.

Filmography

Television

References

External links

Canadian film actresses
Canadian television actresses
Canadian television writers
Canadian sketch comedians
Canadian Screen Award winners
Living people
This Hour Has 22 Minutes
Canadian women comedians
Canadian comedy writers
Canadian women television writers
Year of birth missing (living people)
21st-century Canadian comedians
Canadian Comedy Award winners